Thomas Chitty was a lawyer.

Thomas Chitty may also refer to:

Thomas Chitty (Lord Mayor of London), Lord Mayor of London
Sir Thomas Chitty, 1st Baronet (1855–1930), of the Chitty baronets
Sir (Thomas) Henry Willes Chitty, 2nd Baronet (1891–1955), of the Chitty baronets
Sir Thomas Chitty, 3rd Baronet (1926–2014), novelist

See also
Chitty (disambiguation)